Schistopterum moebiusi is a species of tephritid or fruit flies in the genus Schistopterum of the family Tephritidae.

Distribution
Israel, Egypt, most of East Africa, South Africa.

References

Tephritinae
Insects described in 1902
Taxa named by Theodor Becker
Diptera of Africa